Diarsia is a genus of moths of the family Noctuidae.

Species
The hoenei species group
Diarsia acutipennis Boursin, 1954
Diarsia caradjai Boursin, 1954
Diarsia claudia Boursin, 1963
Diarsia excelsa Hreblay et Ronkay, 1998
Diarsia fletcheri Boursin, 1969
Diarsia fletcheri afghana Boursin, 1969
Diarsia guadarramensis (Boursin, 1931)
Diarsia hoenei Boursin, 1954
Diarsia hoenei nepalensis Hreblay et Ronkay, 1998)
Diarsia nyei Boursin, 1969
Diarsia nyei ferruginea Chen, 1984
Diarsia robusta Boursin, 1954
Diarsia vulpina (Moore, 1882)
The canescens species group
Diarsia canescens (Butler, 1878)
The acharista species group
Diarsia acharista Boursin, 1954
Diarsia eleuthera Boursin, 1954
Diarsia erythropsis Boursin, 1954
Diarsia flavibrunnea Leech, 1910
Diarsia hypographa Boursin, 1954
Diarsia nipponica Ogata, 1957
Diarsia odontophora Boursin, 1954
Diarsia pseudacharista Boursin, 1954
Diarsia unica Plante, 1994
Diarsia yoshimotoi Plante, 1994
Diarsia ypsiloidea Peregovits et Ronkay, 1999
The polytaenia species group
Diarsia coenostola Boursin, 1954
Diarsia polytaenia Boursin, 1954
The axiologa species group
Diarsia axiologa Boursin, 1954
Diarsia nebula Boursin, 1954
Diarsia orophila Boursin, 1954
Diarsia poliophaea Boursin, 1954
The chalcea species group
Diarsia chalcea Boursin, 1954
Diarsia cia (Strand, 1919)
Diarsia copria Hreblay et Plante, 1995
Diarsia mandarinella (Hampson, 1903)
Diarsia dichroa Boursin, 1954
Diarsia scotodichroa Varga & Ronkay, 2007
Diarsia metadichroa Varga & Ronkay, 2007
Diarsia gozmanyi Varga & Ronkay, 2007 (Vietnam)
Diarsia formosensis (Hampson, 1914)
Diarsia dewitzi (Graeser, 1888) (= Diarsia tarda Leech, 1889)
Diarsia sinuosa (Wileman, 1912)
The basistriga-cerastioides-tincta species group
Diarsia basistriga (Moore, 1867)
Diarsia cerastioides (Moore, 1867)
Diarsia griseithorax Warren, 1912
Diarsia subtincta Chang, 1991
Diarsia tincta (Leech, 1900)
The erubescens species group
Diarsia beckeri Boursin, 1948
Diarsia erubescens (Butler, 1880)
Diarsia formosana Boursin, 1948
Diarsia macrodactyla Boursin, 1954
Diarsia pacifica Boursin, 1943
Diarsia rubicilia (Moore, 1967)
Diarsia ruficauda (Warren, 1909)
Diarsia taidactyla Varga & Ronkay, 2007
The stictica species group
Diarsia carnipennis B.S.Chang, 1991
Diarsia stictica (Poujade, 1887)
The arenosoides species group
Diarsia arenosoides Poole, 1989
The nigrosigna species group
Diarsia deparca (Butler, 1879) (= Diarsia takamukui Matsumura, 1926)
Diarsia nigrosigna (Moore, 1881)
Diarsia postpallida (Prout, 1928)
The albipennis species group
Diarsia albipennis (Butler, 1889)
Diarsia nigrafasciata B.S.Chang, 1991
The mendica species group
Diarsia mendica – ingrailed clay (Fabricius, 1775)
Diarsia obuncula Hampson, 1903
Diarsia henrici (Corti et Draudt, 1933) (= Diarsia diorismena Boursin, 1948)
Diarsia rubifera (Grote, 1875)
Diarsia dislocata (Smith, 1904)
Diarsia jucunda (Walker, [1857])
The esurialis species group
Diarsia calgary (Smith, 1898)
Diarsia esurialis (Grote, 1881)
The rubi species group
Diarsia florida – fen square spot (Schmidt, 1859)
Diarsia rosaria (Grote, 1878)
Diarsia rubi – small square-spot (Vieweg, 1790)
The torva species group
Diarsia metatorva Varga & Ronkay, 2007
Diarsia torva (Corti et Draudt, 1933) (= Diarsia stenoptera Boursin, 1948)
The dahlii species group
Diarsia dahlii – barred chestnut (Hübner, [1813])
Diarsia protodahlii Varga & Ronkay, 2007
The fannyi species group
Diarsia fannyi (Corti et Draudt, 1933)
The brunnea species group
Diarsia brunnea – purple clay ([Schiffermüller], 1775)
Unknown species group
Diarsia banksi Holloway, 1976
Diarsia barlowi Holloway, 1976
Diarsia borneochracea Holloway, 1989
Diarsia dimorpha (Wileman & West, 1928)
Diarsia flavostigma Holloway, 1976
Diarsia gaudens (Hampson, 1905)
Diarsia intermixta (Guenée, 1852)
Diarsia javanica Boursin, 1959
Diarsia kebeae (Walker, 1908)
Diarsia latimacula Kozhanchikov, 1937
Diarsia magnisigna (Prout, 1922)
Diarsia magnisigna angusta (Prout, 1922)
Diarsia ochracea (Walker, 1865)
Diarsia olivacea (Prout, 1922)
Diarsia owgarra (Walker, 1908)
Diarsia pallens Chen, 1993
Diarsia pallidimargo (Prout, 1922)
Diarsia pallidisigna (Prout, 1922)
Diarsia pediciliata (Prout, 1924)
Diarsia pediciliata melanomma (Prout, 1926)
Diarsia pseudobarlowi Holloway, 1989
Diarsia ruptistriga (Walker, 1858)
Diarsia sciera Chen, 1993
Diarsia serrata Holloway, 1976
Diarsia tibetica Chen, 1994
Diarsia stigmatias (Prout, 1924)

References
 Diarsia at Markku Savela's Lepidoptera and Some Other Life Forms
 Natural History Museum Lepidoptera genus database
 On The Taxonomy Of The Genus Diarsia Hübner, 1821 1816 (Lepidoptera: Noctuidae): The Holarctic Species-Groups Of The Genus

 
Noctuinae